is a railway station on the Nanao Line in the town of Hōdatsushimizu, Hakui District, Ishikawa Prefecture, Japan, operated by the West Japan Railway Company (JR West).

Lines

Station layout
The station consists of one ground-level island platform connected to the station building by a footbridge. The station is unattended.

Platforms

Adjacent stations

History
The station opened on May 1, 1950. With the privatization of Japanese National Railways (JNR) on April 1, 1987, the station came under the control of JR West.

Surrounding area

 Dai-ichi Elementary School

See also
 List of railway stations in Japan

External links

  

Railway stations in Ishikawa Prefecture
Stations of West Japan Railway Company
Railway stations in Japan opened in 1950
Nanao Line
Hōdatsushimizu, Ishikawa